Khadaki is a village in the Karmala taluka of Solapur district in Maharashtra state, India.

Demographics
Covering  and comprising 396 households at the time of the 2011 census of India, Khadaki had a population of 1864. There were 984 males and 880 females, with 245 people being aged six or younger.

References

 Villages in Karmala taluka